Richard Parry  is a film director and writer. His documentary and feature films include South West 9 (2001), Shooting Robert King (2008), A Night in the Woods (2012), and Base (2017).

Parry has worked as a director, producer and cameraman in conflict zones such as in the former Yugoslavia, Chechnya, Nagorno Karabakh, Iraq, Afghanistan  and covering the Great Lakes refugee crisis in Zaire. He was one of the original Frontline Television News cameramen / producers.

South West 9 was nominated for a BAFTA award.

Films

Feature films
South West 9 (2001)
A Night in the Woods (2012)
Base (2017)
Cry Me A River (2018)

Documentary Film
Exorcist of Woodgreen (1992)
Bosnian Story (1993)
Heartbreak Hotel (1995)
Generation E (1997)
Full Moon Party (1998)
City Stories (1999)
Gypsy Wars (2005) 
Shooting Robert King (2008)
The Big Gypsy Eviction (2010)
Dale Farm: The Big Eviction (2011)
Billion Pound Base (2014)
Hunted (2015)
Unsolved (2016)
Miranda Barbour: Serial Killer or Liar? (2018)
The Jungle (2018)

Awards and nominations
2001: South West 9 won "Best Music" category, British Independent Film Awards and was nominated in five other categories, including "Best British independent film" and "Douglas Hickox" for Parry's directing.

2002: South West 9 was nominated for "Carl Foreman Award for Special Achievement by a British Director, Writer or Producer in their First Feature Film in 2002", BAFTA

2009: Shooting Robert King won a Ron Tibbett Excellence in Filmmaking Award, Indie Memphis Film Festival, Memphis, TN

References

External links

Living people
British film directors
Year of birth missing (living people)